The World Cup in badminton was an annual tournament organized by the International Management Group (IMG). It was held from 1979 to 1997. After the tournament ceased for seven years, Badminton World Federation decided to bring it back as invitational tournament in 2005, but it was ended after the 2006 event.

Locations

Past winners

Performances by nation

References

External links
http://www.sportsrecords.co.uk/badminton/index.htm 
http://com4.runboard.com/bsportsworld.fswimming.t155
Smash: World Cup

 
World Cup
World cups